The Astronomical Observatory of the University of the Punjab is an astronomical observatory, located in Lahore at the Quaid-i-Azam Campus of the University of the Punjab. The space observatory is operated by the University's Department of Space Science.

History 

The Observatory is 75 years old and was established by the British colonial government in 1932. From its establishment, the space observatory was operated by the Punjab University's Physics department until the creation of a separate research institute, Department of Space Science, in 1985. In 1985, the Punjab University decided to start an academic program in this field and consequently the Department of Astronomy was re-organized as the Department of Space Science in 1985. Since then, the space observatory was constituted under the Department of Space Science.

Equipment 

The space observatory, equipped with a seven-inch refracting telescope and two smaller telescopes, forms one of the departmental teaching laboratories. This is the oldest observatory in the country, and has remained a centre of learning for more than 75 year.

References
 Astronomical Observatory of Punjab University
 Google Maps of Astronomical Observatory of Punjab University

Space programme of Pakistan
Science and technology in Pakistan
University of the Punjab
Astronomical observatories in Pakistan
1932 establishments in India
Buildings and structures in Lahore